Inkstone most commonly refers to:
 Inkstone, a stone mortar for the grinding and containment of ink

Media 
 Inkstone News
 Instone Air Line